Anacampsis blattariella, the birch sober, is a moth of the family Gelechiidae. It is found in most of Europe, except Ireland, the Iberian Peninsula and most of the Balkan Peninsula.

The wingspan is 16–19 mm. Adults are on wing from July to September.

The larvae feed on Betula species. They roll a leaf of their host plant longitudinally along the midrib. Larvae can be found in May and June. Pupation takes place in the larval feeding place.

References

Moths described in 1796
Anacampsis
Moths of Europe